The Luzon broad-toothed rat (Abditomys latidens) is a species of rodent in the family Muridae.

It is endemic to central and northern Luzon in the Philippines.  It is the only member of the genus Abditomys.

References

Muridae
Rats of Asia
Endemic fauna of the Philippines
Rodents of the Philippines
Fauna of Luzon
Mammals described in 1952
Taxonomy articles created by Polbot
Taxa named by Colin Campbell Sanborn